Abraham of Arrazd was an Armenian priest and a disciple of the Leontine martyrs.  Like his teachers, he was subjected to prolonged torture, but unlike them, was eventually set free. He then left society to become a hermit, remaining one until his death in the 5th century.

He is regarded as a saint by the Armenian Church, with a feast day of December 20.

References

Sources
 Holweck, F. G. A Biographical Dictionary of the Saints. St. Louis, MO: B. Herder Book Co. 1924.

Year of birth missing
5th-century deaths
Armenian saints
Armenian hermits
5th-century Christian saints
5th-century Christian clergy
Saints of the Armenian Apostolic Church